Lintner may refer to:

 John Lintner, economist and professor
 Joseph Albert Lintner, American entomologist
 Richard Lintner, slovak ice hockey player
 °Lintner or Degrees Lintner, unit of measure

See also 
 Lindner (disambiguation)